The 2017 Categoría Primera A season (officially known as the 2017 Liga Águila season for sponsorship reasons) was the 70th season of Colombia's top-flight football league. Santa Fe were the defending champions having won the title in the 2016 season's Finalización tournament. The season started on 3 February and concluded on 17 December.

In the Torneo Apertura, Atlético Nacional won its sixteenth title after beating Deportivo Cali in the finals, while in the Torneo Finalización Millonarios defeated crosstown rivals Santa Fe in the finals to win its fifteenth title.

Format
The league was played under the same format used since the 2015 season. The Apertura and Finalización tournaments were divided into three stages: a First Stage which was contested on a single round-robin basis, with each team playing the other teams once and playing a regional rival once more for a total of 20 matches. The top eight teams after the twenty rounds advanced to a knockout round, where they were pitted into four ties to be played on a home-and-away basis, with the four winners advancing to the semifinals and the winner of each semifinal advancing to the final of the tournament, which was played on a home-and-away basis as well. The winner of the final in each tournament was declared the tournament champion and will participate in the 2018 Copa Libertadores, as well as the top team in the aggregate table not yet qualified and the Copa Colombia champions. The next four best teams in the aggregate table qualified for the 2018 Copa Sudamericana.

Teams 
20 teams took part, eighteen of them returning from last season plus América de Cali and Tigres, who were promoted from the 2016 Primera B. The former returned to the top tier after 5 years while the latter competed in the Primera A for the first time ever. Both promoted teams replaced Boyacá Chicó and Fortaleza who were relegated at the end of the last season.

Stadia and locations 

a: Played its Torneo Apertura home games at Estadio Álvaro Gómez Hurtado in Floridablanca due to remodeling works at Estadio Alfonso López.
b: Temporarily plays its home games at Estadio Pascual Guerrero in Cali since Estadio Doce de Octubre failed to meet league requirements. Cortuluá used the Estadio Francisco Rivera Escobar in Palmira for its home game against Deportes Tolima.
c: Deportivo Cali used the Estadio Pascual Guerrero for its home games against Atlético Huila and Cortuluá.
d: Junior used the Estadio Jaime Morón León in Cartagena for its home games until late March due to works on the pitch at Estadio Metropolitano Roberto Meléndez.
e: La Equidad used the Estadio El Campín for its home games against América de Cali and Atlético Nacional.
f: Tigres used the Estadio El Campín for its home game against Atlético Nacional.

Managerial changes

Torneo Apertura

First stage
The First stage began on 3 February and consisted of twenty rounds including a series of regional rivalries in the tenth round. It ended on 29 May with the top eight teams at the end of this stage advancing to the knockout phase.

Standings

Results

Knockout phase bracket

Quarterfinals

|}

First leg

†: Match played behind closed doors.

Second leg

Semifinals

|}

First leg

†: Match played behind closed doors.

Second leg

Finals

Atlético Nacional won 5–3 on aggregate.

Top goalscorers

Source: Dimayor

Torneo Finalización

First stage
The First stage began on 7 July and featured the same format used in the Torneo Apertura, with reversed fixtures. It concluded on 19 November with the top eight teams at the end of this stage advancing to the knockout stage.

Standings

Results

Knockout phase bracket

Quarterfinals

|}

First leg

Second leg

Semifinals

|}

First leg

Second leg

Finals

Millonarios won 3–2 on aggregate.

Top goalscorers

Source: Soccerway

Aggregate table

Relegation
A separate table is kept to determine the teams that get relegated to the Categoría Primera B for the next season. The table includes an average of all first stage games played for the current season and the previous two seasons. For purposes of elaborating the table, promoted teams are given the same point and goal tallies as the team in the 18th position at the start of the season.

Source: DimayorRules for classification: 1st average; 2nd goal difference; 3rd number of goals scored; 4th away goals scored.

See also
 2017 Categoría Primera B season
 2017 Copa Colombia
 2018 Superliga Colombiana

References

External links 
 Dimayor's official website 

Categoría Primera A seasons
Categoria Primera A season
1